"Josephine" was a 1936 song with music by Wayne King and Burke Bivens and lyrics by Gus Kahn.

It was first recorded by Wayne King and his Orchestra and issued on Victor 25518-A, which became one of the band's best selling recordings.

The song was covered by many artists including: 
Les Paul with Mary Ford, 1951, peak position no. 12
Charlie Blackwell, 1959 
 Paul Muench Trio, 1960
Bill Black's Combo, 1960, peak position no. 18
The Lane Quintet, 1960 
The Multiple Guitars of Peter Posa, 1960  
National Singers of U.S.A., 1960 
Russ Morgan and his orchestra, 1961
Ray Charles
Connie Barber
Earl Bostic and his Orchestra 
Lawrence Welk and his Champagne Music 
George Poole Orchestra
Jim Hall (musician) and his Orchestra, 1963 
Johnny Maddox and the Rhythmasters, 1954  
Norman Lee (musician), 1964
Russ Carlyle, 1967 
Mose Allison (jazz singer), 1987

References

1951 songs
Wayne King songs
Songs with music by Wayne King
Songs with lyrics by Gus Kahn